Red River is an unincorporated community located in the town of Richmond, Shawano County, Wisconsin, United States.

References

Unincorporated communities in Shawano County, Wisconsin
Unincorporated communities in Wisconsin